The Kudz Ze Kayah mine is a proposed lead and zinc mine in Canada. The mine is located in north-western Canada in Yukon. In June 2022, the project was given final approval by the Government of Canada and the Government of Yukon.

References 

Lead and zinc mines in Canada
Mines in Yukon